Andrea Luka Zimmerman is a Jarman Award winning artist, filmmaker and cultural activist whose work focuses on aspects of working class experience, and that of people margnalised by mainstream society, that are seldom seen or discussed. Andrea works across media in a commmitted and heightened register that allows those lives portrayed their full representation beyond simple and reductive definitions of economy, geography and gender.

Films include the Artangel produced Here For Life (2019), winning Special Mention at the Cineasti Del Presente international competition of the 72nd Locarno Film Festival, 2019 and first prize (feature film) at the Palmares Festival De Cinema En Ville! - 2020, Erase and Forget (2017), world premiere at the Berlin Film Festival (nominated for the Glashutte Original Documentary Award), Estate, a Reverie (2015) (nominated for the Grierson Award)  and Taskafa, Stories of the Street (2013) which was written and voiced by John Berger.

Life and career 
Andrea Luka Zimmerman grew up on several large public housing estates, including the Wohnring in Neuperlach, Germany, and left school at 16. After moving to London in 1991, she studied at Central Saint Martins for a PhD. She co-founded the film collective Vision Machine (collaborators on Academy Award-nominated feature documentary The Look of Silence). Vision Machine was created in 2001 as an experimental filmmaking collective with the aim to research, analyse and respond to the conditions and mechanisms of economic, political and military power. Its members were Christine Cynn, Joshua Oppenheimer, Michael Uwemedimo, Andrea Luka Zimmerman. Zimmerman co-founded the cultural collective Fugitive Images, alongside Lasse Johansson and David Roberts in 2009. Andrea is Professor of Possible film at Central Saint Martins.

Awards 
In addition to awards for her films, in 2020 Zimmerman received the Filmlondon Jarman Award, which is given in recognition of work to date, with Michelle Williams Gamaker, Rosie Hastings & Hannah Quinlain, Jenn Nkiru, Larissa Sansour, Project Art Works.

Films 
Zimmerman's film Taskafa, Stories of the Street (2013) explores resistance and co-existence through the lives of the street dogs of Istanbul. Featuring text and readings by John Berger, Taskafa gathers the voices of diverse Istanbul residents, shopkeepers, and street based workers, all of whom display a striking commitment to the wellbeing and future of the city's canine population (a community of street dogs, and cats, free of formal ownership but fed and cared for by numerous individuals). It also references the Hayırsızada Dog Massacre of 1911 at Sivriada.

Estate, a Reverie (2015) was made over seven years and tracks the passing of the Haggerston Estate in East London and the utopian promise of social housing it once offered, with a celebration of everyday humanity. It is held in the Arts Council Collection. Erase and Forget (2017) was made over ten years and, through a documentary portrait of "Bo Gritz" explores the limits of deniability and social conscience in an age of constant warfare. It premiered at the 2017 Berlin Film Festival.

Here for Life (2019) is a long term collaboration with theatre-maker and founder of Cardboard Citizens, Adrian Jackson. The film follows ten Londoners through a city framed by capital and loss, as they navigate their wild and wayward way, travelling on their own terms towards a co-existence far stronger than 'community'. On reclaimed land they find themselves on the right side of history, caught between two train tracks, the present tense and future hopes. They question who has stolen what from whom, and how things might be fixed, in an often contradictory rite of passage. Finding solidarity in resistance, they demand the right to go on. Kieron Corless, Sight & Sound called it "A film of great compassion and political and aesthetic ambition, in which the idea of a collective is prioritized for a change, but without sacrificing or downplaying the individual voices and idiosyncrasies that it comprises". The film was widely and warmly received and notably moved in its reception beyond filmgoing audiences. Lemn Sissay wrote, "I just wanted to share the vastness of this beautiful piece of work with people".

Art 
Art exhibitions and projects include i am here, a public artwork in Haggerston, Hackney, which was made in response to the experience of living on a council estate which was being gentrified. For this, large photos of residents from the estate were placed over the windows of vacated flats, with the intention of opening up a "reflective space concerning issues about visibility and 'urban regeneration'". Real Estates (co-curated with David Roberts), PEER with LUX, London (2015), was a multifaceted project around issues of housing, social justice and public space in East London. Common Ground, Spike Island, Bristol (2017) comprised an exhibition, screening, talks and discussions around strategies of social and cultural resistance and ways of living together. Civil Rites (2017) was made in response to a speech on the interlinked nature of "war, poverty, racism" given by Martin Luther King Jr. at Newcastle University, and was first shown at Tyneside Cinema Gallery in Newcastle in 2017/18, and London Open triennial at Whitechapel Gallery in 2018. Art Class (2020), a filmed performance lecture exploring the tension between the words in its title, proposing a multylayered social dreaming, premiered at the 2020 Filmlondon Jarman Award and has been shown internationally, mostly accompanied by conversations, including with Morgan Quaintance.

Andrea highlights collaborative and engaged ways of working, alongside dangers posed by extractive industry practices, in the Anthology Strangers Within: Documentary as Encounter, and also in Below the Radar: Episode 136: Experimental Documentary Practices in conversation with Am Johal. During the 2020 COVID-19 pandemic, Zimmerman curated a season of films for Loneliness Awareness Week, with Birds Eye View. She wrote about Věra Chytilová's film Daisies, highlighting the 'invigorating rigour that Daisies brings to my perception of reality' and also for the Harun Farocki Institute asked 'what does it mean to consider the lives of others?'.

Filmography 
The Delmarva Chicken of Tomorrow (short, 2003)
The Globalisation Tapes (2003) (additional editor and camera) a collaboration between the Independent Plantation Workers' Union of Sumatra, the International Union of Food and Agricultural Workers (IUF), and Vision Machine
The Last Biscuit (short, 2005) a collaboration with Paul Hallam
The Ramp (short, 2010)
Merzschmerz (Film and Video Umbrella) (short, 2012)
Towards Estate (short, 2012)
Taskafa, Stories of the Street (2013)
Estate, A Reverie (feature, 2015)
More Utopias Now (Channel 4 Random Acts), (short, 2016)
Lower Street, a Night's Journey (Tintype) (short, 2016)
Civil Rites (Tyneside Cinema) (short, 2017)
Erase and Forget (feature, 2017)
Onions in the Plughole (short, 2018), on artist Marcia Farquhar
Here For Life (Artangel) (feature, 2019) a collaboration with Adrian Jackson

Exhibitions and projects 
i am here (Zimmerman, Johansson, Fennell), large scale public art work on the Haggerston Estate (2009–2014)
Real Estates (co-curated with David Roberts), PEER Gallery, in association with LUX, London (2015)
Common Ground (solo), Spike Island, Bristol (2017)
London Open (group), triennial at Whitechapel Gallery (2018)
Art Class, METAL, Liverpool (2020) 
Selter in Place (3 screen installation, Chalkwell Park, 2021), Esturary Festival

Books 
Contribution in Strangers Within: Documentary as Encounter: ed. Therese Henningsen and Juliette Joffee, 2022, Prototype, London, pp. 65-78. ISBN 978-1-913513-30-6
Co-author of Estate: Art, Politics and Social Housing in Britain: Myrdle Court Press, 2010 
Contribution in Truth, Dare or Promise: Art and Documentary Revisited. London & New York: Cambridge Scholars Publishing, 2013, . (Edited by Gail Pearce, Jill Daniels, Cahal McLaughlin)
Featured in With Dogs At The Edge of Life: Columbia University Press, 2015, Colin Dayan .
Featured in Political Animals: The New Feminist Cinema: I.B. Tauris, 2016, So Mayer .
Featured in The Routledge Companion to Cinema and Politics: edited by Yannis Tzioumakis, Claire Molloy, 2016 .
Featured in Non-Cinema: Global Digital Film-making and the Multitude, William Brown, 2018,.
Featured in Other Modernities in conversation with Caterina Sartori, Università degli Studi di Milano, 2018,  
Contribution to and co-editor of Doorways: Women, Homelessness, Trauma and Resistance - Shiri Shalmy and Andrea Luka Zimmerman on cultural production under capitalism and the role of art and artists in a social crisis, House Sparrow Press, 2019 
Contribution in Annual Art Journal ISSUE 08, ERASE, On Erasure, Lasalle College of the Arts, 2019, 
Contribution in Another Gaze, a Feminist Film Journal, Vol 04, Otherwise: Notes on Being Perennially In-Between, pp. 30–35, 2020

Articles 
Andrea Luka Zimmerman Interview - Here For Life, Studio International, 2019
Secreting History - Screening 'History': 21 takes in "La Furia Umana"  LFU/36, April 2019
Text for the Living School publication, conceived and ed. by Brandon LaBelle (for South London Gallery), 2018.
Co-existence: A modest proposal for preventing the street dogs of Istanbul from being a burden on their neighbourhoods and citizenry, in SEQUENCE New Artists' Film and Video, Vol 4., ed. Simon Payne, no.w.here, 2016, pp. 36–38
Estates of Being: Thoughts on the place of living and working, Focaalblog, 2015
Human Conditions: the Lives of Estate/s in "La Furia Umana", April 2015
Amsler; Pinder; Hope; Owen; Roberts; Shah; Zimmerman; Theron Schmidt; a response to Beyond Glorious, the Radical in Engaged Practices, Rajni Shah; in 'CTR Backpages 24.2', Contemporary Theatre Review, Routledge, Vol. 24, No. 2, 284–299, May 2014
The Certainty of Uncertainty (Zimmerman / Roberts), in "London's Regeneration Realities", ed. Ben Campkin, David Roberts, Rebecca Ross. Urban Lab, 12/2013
Truth, Dare or Promise: Art and Documentary Revisited. (text and image): Homeland (In)Securities, ed Jill Daniels, Cahal McLaughlin and Gail Pearce, Cambridge Scholars, 11/2013
On common ground: the making of meaning in film and life, Open Democracy, 2013
Estate in three Parts. Text, Image and moving image for The Home and The World, Dartington, online publication, 10/2013
Thinking in Practice, Balmond Studio. Re-imagining Council Housing, Q&As. Andrea Luka Zimmerman and David Roberts respond to Alisha Haridasani. September 5, 2013.
Come Together, (text and image) Signes du Nuit, June 2013.
Homecultures, (peer reviewed text and photo essay) Zimmerman / Johansson, Berg, 2011
Estate: Art, Politics and Social Housing in Britain. Myrdle Court Press, ed. and photography by Zimmerman / Johansson, with Tristan Fennell, Paul Hallam, Victor Buchli, Cristina Cerulli, launched during TINAG [This is not a Gateway] festival, Oct. 2010. Second edition August 2012.
2010: In Wait, Visual essay in Estate: Art, Politics and Social Housing in Britain (Zimmerman, Johansson, Fennell) Myrdle Court Press.
Street Signs. Zimmerman / Johansson, Centre for Urban and Community Research, Goldsmiths, University, spring, 2010
I AM HERE: some thoughts on site-specificity and instrumentality. Site Specific Art. Zimmerman / Johansson, December 2009

References

External links 

1969 births
Living people
Alumni of Central Saint Martins
British filmmakers
British women activists
British women artists
Working class in Europe
Working-class culture
Working-class culture in the United Kingdom